The 2013 Vuelta a España began on 23 August, and stage 12 occurs on 5 September. The second half of the race takes in most of the mountain stages, with 5 occurring in the last 9 days. This part of the race is where the winner should be confirmed, with large time gaps expected to appear during the mountain stages.

Stage 12
5 September 2013 — Maella to Tarragona,

Stage 13
6 September 2013 — Valls to Castelldefels,

Stage 14
7 September 2013 — Bagà to Andorra–Collada de la Gallina (Andorra),

Stage 15
8 September 2013 — Andorra (Andorra) to Peyragudes (France),

Stage 16
9 September 2013 — Graus to Sallent de Gállego–Aramón Formigal,

Stage 17
11 September 2013 — Calahorra to Burgos,

Stage 18
12 September 2013 — Burgos to Peña Cabarga,

Stage 19
13 September 2013 — San Vicente de la Barquera to Oviedo–Alto Naranco,

Stage 20
14 September 2013 — Avilés to Alto de L'Angliru,

Stage 21
15 September 2013 — Leganés to Madrid,

Notes

References

2013 Vuelta a España
Vuelta a España stages